James M. Smith Jr (ca. 1810 – June 5, 1898) was an American lawyer and politician from New York.

Background
Smith was born in New Baltimore, New York circa 1810.

In November 1854, he was elected on the Democratic ticket (a fusion of Hards and Softs) as Recorder of New York City, defeating the incumbent Francis R. Tillou. Upon the creation of the Metropolitan Police in 1857, Recorder Smith became one of the commissioners of the Police Board, along with Mayor Fernando Wood and City Judge Sydney H. Stuart. When Mayor Wood resisted the new police force, maintaining the abolished Municipal Police instead, Smith issued a warrant for the arrest of the mayor, which led to the New York City Police Riot. In October 1857, Smith was defeated for re-nomination on the Tammany ticket by George G. Barnard.

Later Smith left Tammany Hall, and joined the Anti-Tammany Democratic organizations in New York City, like Mozart Hall and Irving Hall. In 1872, Smith was nominated for New York County District Attorney on the "National Democratic" ticket.

Personal life 
Smith married Emily F. Sherman, and they had eleven children. In the summer of 1896, his wife died in a horse-carriage accident. Smith then retired from the bar, sold his home and moved into a boarding house. Smith died from "rheumatic gout" in Manhattan. He was buried in the Sherman family plot in New Baltimore, New York.

Sources
The New York Civil List compiled by Franklin Benjamin Hough (page 428; Weed, Parsons and Co., 1858)
CITY POLITICS; ...Soft-Shell Judiciary Convention in NYT on October 12, 1854
City Nominations for Congress, Assembly, and City and County Offices in NYT on November 1, 1854
Democratic primary Nominations in NYT on October 17, 1857
THE PEACE DEMOCRACY in NYT on May 8, 1863
POLITICAL BREVITIES in NYT on October 16, 1872
IRVING HALL DEMOCRATS in NYT on February 24, 1882
DEATH OF FRANK SHERMAN SMITH in NYT on April 6, 1885
JAMES M. SMITH DEAD in NYT on June 6, 1898

Date of birth unknown
1898 deaths
New York City Recorders
People from New Baltimore, New York
New York (state) Democrats
Year of birth uncertain